Ashley Farquharson (born March 16, 1999) is an American luger who represented the United States at the 2022 Winter Olympics.

Career
Farquharson won a silver medal at the 2021 America-Pacific Luge Championship in the singles luge and a silver medal in the team relay at the 2021–22 Luge World Cup.

She represented the United States at the 2022 Winter Olympics in the women's singles luge event and finished in 12th place.

References

External links
 
 
 
 

1999 births
American female lugers
Living people
Lugers at the 2022 Winter Olympics
Olympic lugers of the United States
People from Park City, Utah
Lugers at the 2016 Winter Youth Olympics